Lower Chandmari Ward is a ward located under Nagaland's capital city, Kohima. The ward falls under the designated Ward No. 13 of the Kohima Municipal Council.

Attractions
Kohima Lotha Baptist Church

The Kohima Lotha Baptist Church is one of the biggest churches in Kohima is located at Lower Chandmari Ward.

Education
Educational Institutions in Lower Chandmari Ward:

Schools 
 Lower Chandmari Government Middle School
 St. Joseph High School
 Government High School

See also
 Municipal Wards of Kohima

References

External links
 Map of Kohima Ward No. 13

Kohima
Wards of Kohima